Brahmachari is a 1968 Indian Telugu-language comedy drama film, produced by A. V. Subba Rao under the Prasad Art Productions banner and directed by T. Rama Rao. The film stars Akkineni Nageswara Rao and Jayalalithaa, with music composed by T. Chalapathi Rao. It was released on 1 February 1968. The film was remade in Hindi as Ek Nari Ek Brahmachari (1971).

Plot 
Ramakrishna (Akkineni Nageswara Rao) a college student, is a devout worshiper of Lord Hanuman and vows celibacy. Vasantha (Jayalalitha) his classmate quite likes his nobleness. Raisahib Parandhamaiah his father (Nagabhushanam) a domineering paterfamilias person is distressed by Ramakrishna's behavior. Once the entire college visits a picnic spot where unintentionally Ramakrishna misplaces Vasantha's locket. Remorseful Ramakrishna replaces it with a pendant when his naughty friend takes a photograph and also writes a love letter to Vasantha forging Ramakrishna's signature. Parallelly, a glimpse, Raisahib plots to perform espousal of Ramakrishna with Kokila (Rama Prabha) daughter of a wealthy man Bangaraiah (Ramana Reddy) and love interest to Ramakrishna's best friend Joogulu (Chalam). Both of them make a game plan when Ramakrishna sends Joogulu as an alternative and they are coupled up. In the meantime, squeeze out her love when Ramakrishna scorns the women and Vasantha flounces out, vowing to become his bride. After a few days, as a flabbergast, Vasantha arrives at Raisahib's house along with a baby claiming that Ramakrishna had married and abandoned her. Immediately, Ramakrishna rushes when she shows the love letter & pendant as proof and residence. At present, Ramakrishna tries to expose her lies in many ways but fails. Right now, Raisahib & his wife Gajalaxmi (Suryakantham) decides to couple up Ramakrishna & Vasantha officially when they call their elder son Anand Rao (Prabhakar Reddy) & daughter-in-law Shanta (Pushpa Kumari). Here Ananda Rao recognizes Vasantha also intimidates which Ramakrishna overhears and seeks for truth. Then Vasantha narrates the past, Ananda Rao deceived Vasantha's elder sister Janaki (Sukanya) and she died after giving birth to the baby. Before dying, Janaki takes a word from Vasantha to make the child Raisahib's heir and to fulfill her sister's dream Vasantha has done the play. At last, Anand Rao reforms and accepts the baby when Vasantha is about to leave Ramakrishna dedicates his celibacy to her. Finally, the movie ends on a happy note with the marriage of Ramakrishna & Vasantha.

Cast 
Akkineni Nageswara Rao as Ramakrishna
Jayalalithaa as Vasantha
Nagabhushanam as Rao Sahib Parandhamaiah
Ramana Reddy as Bangaraiah
Chalam as Jogulu
Raja Babu as Devaiah
Prabhakar Reddy as Ananda Rao
Raavi Kondala Rao as Doctor
Perumallu as Vasantha's grandfather
Potti Prasad as Sodabuddi
Suryakantham as Gajalakshmi
Rama Prabha as Mallika
Sukanya as Janaki
Pushpa Kumari as Shanta

Soundtrack 
Music composed by T. Chalapathi Rao.

References

External links 
 

1960s Telugu-language films
1968 films
Films directed by T. Rama Rao
1968 comedy-drama films
Films scored by T. Chalapathi Rao
Indian comedy-drama films
Telugu films remade in other languages